Failon Ngayon is a Philippine television news magazine show broadcast by ABS-CBN, hosted by Ted Failon. The program premiered on October 24, 2009, and prior to its cancellation, it aired every Saturday on the network's Yes Weekend! block.

History

Overview
The show offered investigative reports, public service, features and stories of national importance taken from the viewpoint of individual/s involved with or in conflict with various issues. Failon brings his wit, humor and intelligent analysis to national issues that negatively affects the Filipinos, with the mantra "Sa Mga Isyu ng Bayan, Lahat Tayo Sila may Pakialam!" (lit. In the Nation's Issues, Everyone Needs they to Know!) in mind.

2009–2015: as a late-afternoon show
Failon Ngayon premiered on October 24, 2009 as one of the new shows unveiled by ABS-CBN, along with It's Showtime. It also served as lead-in to TV Patrol Sabado (now TV Patrol Weekend).

Initially, the show was formatted as an extension of the Tambalan radio program co-hosted by Failon and Korina Sanchez, featuring a mix of analysis on topical serious issues and public service reports. On select weeks, it also catered to celebrity interviews and humorous features, emulating the styles of American late-night talk shows.

The show was then produced within the ABS-CBN studios with Failon as host and Zhander Cayabyab (who later became a DZMM reporter) as his sidekick, soundman and humor features reporter.

On September 2011, the program reformatted to become more documentary-investigative leaning with several topics discussed over multiple weeks. To cater to the new format, Failon mostly ventured outside the studio as a pre-taped program with additional man-on-the street interviews.

2015–2020: as a late-night program
On November 21, 2015, the show moved to a late-evening slot, trading timeslots with Celebrity Playtime and serving as a lead-in to The Bottomline with Boy Abunda.

The program's eventual last episode aired on May 2, 2020, as a week later the show suspended airings due to the temporary closure of ABS-CBN as a result of the cease and desist order of the National Telecommunications Commission (NTC), following the expiration five days prior of the network's 25-year franchise granted in 1995.

On July 15, 2020, the current affairs division's documentary section of ABS-CBN News, including staff from the program became part of the series of retrenchments following the July 10 vote of the House Committee on Legislative Franchises denying the network a fresh congressional franchise, officially cancelling the program. However, its sister radio program continued airing until August 31, when Failon left the network and transferred to TV5 starting October 5, 2020, alongside DJ Chacha, with their new radio program entitled Ted Failon at DJ Chacha sa Radyo5.

Host
 Ted Failon

Awards and nominations

References

External links
 Failon Ngayon at ABS-CBN.com

ABS-CBN original programming
ABS-CBN News and Current Affairs shows
2009 Philippine television series debuts
2020 Philippine television series endings
Philippine television news shows
Philippine documentary television series
Philippine television docudramas
Filipino-language television shows